Nancy King (born June 15, 1940) is a jazz singer from Portland, Oregon.
Known for her masterful scatting and elastic range, King has performed in worldwide tours and recordings, as well as collaborations with such artists as Jon Hendricks, Vince Guaraldi, Ralph Towner, Dave Friesen and others.

King started gigging in 1959 with fellow University of Oregon music students. After moving to San Francisco in 1960, her accomplished Scat singing landed her many gigs with various bebop artists.

In 2004 King recorded her live album Live at Jazz Standard with pianist Fred Hersch.

Discography 
 Impending Bloom with Glen Moore (Justice, 1991)
 Potato Radio with Glen Moore (Justice, 1992)
 Cliff Dance with Glen Moore (Justice, 1993)
 Straight into Your Heart with Steve Christofferson and the Metropole Orchestra (Mons, 1996)
 King on the Road (Cardas, 1999)
 Moonray (Philology, 1999)
 Dream Lands Vol. 1 with Steve Christofferson (Stellar!, 2000)
 Dream Lands Vol. 2 with Steve Christofferson (Stellar!, 2002)
 Live at the Jazz Standard with Fred Hersch (Maxjazz, 2006) – live
 Perennial (Ornry Diva, 2011)

Guest appearances 
With Karrin Allyson
 Footprints (Concord Jazz, 2006)

With Ray Brown
 Christmas Songs with the Ray Brown Trio (Telarc, 1999)
 Some of My Best Friends Are Singers (Telarc, 1998)

With Roy Nathanson
 Fire at Keaton's Bar and Grill (Six Degrees, 2000)	

With Oregon
 45th Parallel (Portrait, 1989)

References 

American women jazz singers
American jazz singers
Musicians from Portland, Oregon
Singers from Oregon
1940 births
Jazz musicians from Oregon
Living people
21st-century American women singers
21st-century American singers